La tabernera del puerto (also known as Romance Marinero) is a zarzuela in three acts by composer Pablo Sorozábal. The opera uses a Spanish-language libretto by Federico Romero and Guillermo Fernández-Shaw. The work premiered at the Teatro Tívoli in Barcelona on 6 April 1936.

The aria "No puede ser" is a popular excerpt.

Roles

References

1936 operas
Operas
Operas by Pablo Sorozábal
Spanish-language operas
Zarzuelas